Angulomicrobium  is a genus of bacteria from the family of Hyphomicrobiaceae.

References

 

Hyphomicrobiales
Bacteria genera